The California Community Foundation (CCF) is a philanthropic organization located in Los Angeles, California. Foundation Center, an independent nonprofit organization, ranks it among the top 100 foundations in the nation by asset size and total giving. Among all community foundations, CCF is 5th by total giving and 7th by asset size, as of the fiscal year that ended 6/30/12.

Mission and philanthropic empowerment 
CCF is public, charitable organization dedicated to strengthening communities of Los Angeles County through effective philanthropy and civic engagement. It fulfills its mission through fundraising, charitable fund management, grantmaking, and meetings with donors, financial advisors, local nonprofits and foundation partners. It also serves as an advocate for the vulnerable and poor.

History 

1915 – CCF is established by Joseph Sartori and managed by Security Trust and Savings Bank in Los Angeles. For the next 65 years, the community foundation stays relatively small and is affectionately known as the “typewriter foundation” for making small grants mostly for equipment and capital.

1946 – Mary Bierce becomes first full-time employee of the foundation. Joseph Sartori passes and leaves the foundation $1 million in his estate.

1955 – The foundation achieves $10 million in assets and awards $300,000 in grants.

1963 – The first donor advised funds are established at the foundation by Eugene and Harold Stern.

1976 – David Hess is named Executive Secretary of the foundation. At this time, the foundation still functions in close association with the trust department of Security Pacific National Bank as a "trust-form" community foundation.

1980 – David Hess resigns as Executive Secretary and the board of trustees hires Jack Shakely as the foundation's first Executive Director.

1986 – When the AIDS epidemic begins ravaging Los Angeles, CCF and donors take the lead in addressing prevention, treatment, and social services while funding vital programs that are deemed “too controversial” by government agencies.

1986 – As a result of a fire that nearly destroys the historic Los Angeles Public Library, CCF launches the Save the Books campaign and 10,000 donors respond.

1988 – With an initial gift from the J. Paul Getty Trust, CCF establishes an annual fellowship program for emerging and mid-career visual artists who live and work in L.A.

1997 – Peter Drucker, the father of modern management and a mentor of CCF executive vice president Joe Lumarda, names CCF one of the 10 best-managed nonprofits in the U.S.

1999 – The sale of Centinela Hospital Medical Center results in the creation of the Centinela Medical Community Fund and Centinela Medical Care Fund at CCF to ensure that residents of Inglewood, Hawthorne, Lennox, Los Angeles, El Segundo, Watts, Compton, and Lawndale continue to have access to affordable health care services.

2000 – With gifts from two anonymous donors, CCF establishes a fund to provide fast, one-time assistance to individuals in dire financial situations, asking only that beneficiaries “pass it along” with two acts of kindness to others. 

2002 – CCF establishes the Community Foundation Land Trust in order to create development opportunities for affordable homes, achieve equity appreciation for entry-level homeowners, and ensure homes remain permanently affordable for generations. Over the next seven years, CCF will invest more than $20 million in properties within Los Angeles County.

2004 – Jack Shakely retires as president after 24 years. In that time, he grew the assets of the foundation, distinguished CCF in national philanthropic circles, and laid the groundwork for future expansion of the foundation's assets and influence in the region. Antonia Hernández, a former member of the board of directors, becomes the California Community Foundation's President and CEO.

2006 – In October, the foundation announces a $200 million bequest from the late philanthropist Joan Palevsky. Her unrestricted gift is CCF’s largest to date, boosting its assets to more than $1 billion and doubling its community grantmaking to about $20 million annually.

2006 – CCF launches the El Monte Community Building Initiative (CBI), a landmark 10-year initiative to engage residents of the City of El Monte in developing solutions that will ensure children and youth grow up healthier and better prepared for college and careers.

2006 – CCF opens the Iraq Afghanistan Deployment Impact Fund (IADIF) with one donor for the purpose of funding nonprofit organizations that support U.S. military personnel and families who are being impacted by deployments to Iraq and Afghanistan.

2007 – CCF launches the Los Angeles Preschool Advocacy Initiative (LAPAI) to educate parents on the importance of early learning and involvement in their children's education, engage local and regional policymakers, and award grants to nonprofit organizations.

2008 – The foundation achieves $1 billion in assets, managing 1,500 unique charitable funds.

2009 – CCF makes emergency grants to support the fight of massive wildfires in the Angeles National Forest, as it did in response to similar California fires in 2003 and in 2007.

2010 – CCF receives the Council on Foundations' 2010 Critical Impact Award for community foundations for the Iraq Afghanistan Deployment Impact Fund. Since 2006, IADIF has distributed $243 million to 53 nonprofits nationwide for the support of more than two million troops and family members.

2010 – The 2010 Census Initiative of CCF achieves its goal of a 70 percent participation rate by L.A. County residents in the population census through a combination of cross-sector partnerships, strategic grantmaking, and innovative technology and data.

2011 – CCF and The Eisner Foundation honor six outstanding nonprofits and three extraordinary individuals with the Unsung Heroes of Los Angeles Awards.

2011 – An anonymous bequest allows CCF to launch "Preparing Achievers for Tomorrow" (PAT), a $12 million investment in community-based nonprofits providing music, sports and recreation programs to 14- to 18-year-olds in South L.A.

2012 – CCF launches a five-year, $5 million initiative, called Building a Lifetime of Opportunities and Options for Men (BLOOM), concentrated in South L.A.

Program areas
CCF provides grants and other support to a range of local nonprofits with an emphasis on helping vulnerable populations and strengthening communities of L.A. County in five areas.

The Arts Program aims to strengthen the cultural vitality of L.A. County by increasing the operational capacity of small and mid-size arts and cultural organizations, increasing arts opportunities that are affordable and accessible to underserved communities, and improving participation in the arts by diverse, low-income residents and professional artists.

The Education Program focuses on improving school readiness and K-5 student performance in reading and math while supporting partnerships among schools, districts, teachers and parents that demonstrate a commitment to this goal.

The Health Care Program seeks to improve access to regular, sustainable and affordable sources of quality health care for low-income adults and children, with a focus on community clinics and uninsured individuals.

The Housing and Neighborhoods Program concentrates on increasing access to affordable housing and efforts that emphasize multiservice, geographically focused approaches to improve the conditions of underserved neighborhoods. In conjunction with this program, the Community Foundation Land Trust of CCF buys land, works with private and public partners that obtain financing and approvals to build, and then ensures that they remain affordable homes for decades to come.

Foundation grants are also made on a limited basis to nonprofits for adults with developmental disabilities, aging adults, animal welfare, disaster relief, and transitional-age foster youth. Donor advised grants comprise the majority of annual grantmaking by CCF and may be directed to worthwhile causes and qualified organizations anywhere in the world.

Civic engagement
CCF believes the actions of ordinary people can affect the outcomes of larger issues in their lives through collective engagement and shared problem-solving, and therefore is an advocate, leader and investor in civic engagement activities that foster social change. These activities include:

Immigrant Integration A concentrated effort through local nonprofits with cultural competence to integrate newcomers into the social, civic and economic fabric of life in L.A. County.

Los Angeles Citizenship Collaboration An initiative to encourage and assist eligible Legal Permanent residents to become U.S. citizens, in partnership with members of the nonprofit, public and private sectors and local funders.

Los Angeles Preschool Advocacy Initiative A multi-year effort since 2007 with the David and Lucille Packard Foundation to increase access to quality early care and education for underserved communities and to support efforts that address the child care and development needs of children, ages 0–5.

See also
 UMMA Community Clinic

References

External links
California Community Foundation. Official site.

Community foundations based in the United States
Non-profit organizations based in Los Angeles
1915 establishments in California